Bowery Boys may refer to:

 Bowery Boys (gang), a 19th-century New York gang
 The Bowery Boys, a comedy team headlined by Huntz Hall and Leo Gorcey
 Bowery B'hoys, 19th century New York residents

See also
Bowery Boy (film), 1940